Seven Springs is a hamlet in the heavily wooded parish of Coberley in the Cotswold District of Gloucestershire in England,  south of Cheltenham. Including the intersection of the A435 and A436 roads, it has the sources of the River Churn, which flows south across almost a full cross-section of the Cotswolds, through Cirencester, and joins the Thames near Cricklade.

Source of the Thames
Seven Springs features in the long-running argument over the true source of the River Thames.Two plaques at the site read "Hic tuus o Tamesine Pater septemgeminus fons" (Latin for "Here, O Father Thames, is your sevenfold spring"). Seven Springs is further from the mouth of the Thames than the medieval preferred source at Thames Head near Kemble.

In 2012 Coberley Parish Council posted a notice, on site, that "Seven Springs is certainly one of the sources of the River Thames and is held by many to be the ultimate source." Furthermore, the springs at the site flow throughout the year, whereas those at the official source of Thames Head are only seasonal. If this is seen as correct, the Thames may be longer than the River Shannon, making it the longest river in the British Isles.

The stream from Seven Springs is joined within Coberley by a still longer, less reliable tributary, which amounts to the longest headwater of the Thames river system. Its source is in the grounds of the National Star College in the parish of Ullenwood.

References

External links
 Location map (Ordnance Survey)
 GENUKI: Coberley, Gloucestershire - UK genealogy page
Google Earth link of Seven Springs and around

Villages in Gloucestershire
Cotswold District
River Thames